Kate Loye was born in Auckland, New Zealand on 15 May 1993 and has represented New Zealand in association football at international level.

Loye was a member of the New Zealand U-17 side at the 2012 FIFA U-17 Women's World Cup in Trinidad and Tobago, and again at the 2012 FIFA U-20 Women's World Cup in Japan where they were eliminated at the group stages.

Loye made her senior début as a substitute in a 1–5 loss to Brazil on 1 December 2015.

References

Living people
1993 births
Women's association football midfielders
Association footballers from Auckland
New Zealand women's association footballers
New Zealand women's international footballers